
The following is a list of Playboy Playmates of 1991. Playboy magazine names its Playmate of the Month each month throughout the year.

January

Stacy Leigh Arthur (born June 4, 1968, in Naperville, Illinois) is an American model and actress. She was chosen as Playboy's Playmate of the Month for January, 1991. Arthur was also Mrs. Ohio for the 1990 Mrs. America contest.

Arthur's husband, Jim, was the victim of a murder-suicide by a fan named James Lindberg, shortly after Stacy's appearance in Playboy.

February

Cristy Thom (born September 8, 1971, in Los Angeles, also known as Li-Wah Thom) is an American realist painter, model and actress. She was chosen as Playboys Playmate of the Month for February 1991 and has appeared in numerous Playboy videos. Thom was also chosen as the Playmate of the Year in 1992 for the Dutch edition of Playboy. She studied at Otis College of Art and Design and is an artist who paints usually in a photorealist style. Her work has been exhibited at MOCA Los Angeles and the Anchorage Museum, Anchorage, Ak.

March

Julie Anne Clarke (born 11 August 1971 in Tucson, Arizona) is an American model and actress.  Julie was selected as Playboy magazine's Playmate of the Month for March 1991, and she appeared on the cover of the April 1991 issue.

April

Christina Marie Leardini (aka Christina Herbert, born January 22, 1969, in St. Petersburg, Florida) is an American glamour model and actress. She was chosen as Playmate of the Month by Playboy magazine for April, 1991. She was a regular Playboy Newsstand Specials model for about five years after her playmate pictorial.

May

Carrie Jean Yazel (born November 30, 1969) is an American model and actress. She was chosen as Playboy's Playmate of the Month for May, 1991.  Her centerfold was photographed by Stephen Wayda.

June

Saskia Linssen (born 16 February 1970 in Venlo) is a Dutch model and actress. She was chosen as Playboy's Playmate of the Month for June, 1991.

July

Wendy Kaye (born May 5, 1972) is an American model and actress. She was chosen as Playboy's Playmate of the Month for July, 1991 and has appeared in numerous Playboy videos. She also appeared on the cover of the April 1992 issue of the magazine.

August

Corinna Harney (born February 20, 1972) is an American model and actress. She was chosen as Playboy's Playmate of the Month for August, 1991 and Playboy's Playmate of the Year 1992. Harney is sometimes credited as Corina Harney, Corinna Harney-Jones, or Corinna Harney Jones.

September

Samantha Leah Dorman is an American model and actress. She was chosen as Playboys Playmate of the Month for September 1991 and has appeared in numerous Playboy videos. Prior to being a playmate, she appeared on the cover of the July 1991 issue of the magazine. She appeared in an episode of Seinfeld.

October

Cheryl Bachman (born November 18, 1969) is an American model and actress. She was chosen as Playboys Playmate of the Month for October 1991, photographed by Arny Freytag and Stephen Wayda. She also appeared in a group shot on the cover of Playboy for October 1993 and a July 1993 ensemble pictorial, "Lucky Stiff", which was photographed by Stephen Wayda.

November

Tonja Marie Christensen (born September 3, 1971) is an American model and actress. She was chosen as Playboys Playmate of the Month for November 1991. She also appeared on the cover of the April 1993 issue of the magazine.

December

Wendy Hamilton (born December 20, 1967, in Detroit, Michigan) is an American model and actress. After working as a fashion model she was chosen as Playboys Playmate of the Month for December, 1991 and has appeared in numerous Playboy videos. She also appeared in several movies in the early 1990s, such as "Midnight Temptations", released on 11 February 1995.

See also
 List of people in Playboy 1990–1999

References

1991-related lists
1991
Playmates Of 1991